Cliola is an unincorporated historical community in Ellington Township, Adams County, Illinois, United States. Cliola was located along a railroad line northeast of Quincy. In a September 14, 1899 article in The Quincy Whig about the Chicago, Burlington and Quincy Railroad laying a new railroad switch between Eubanks and Cliola it was mentioned that after completion Cliola would no longer exist. There was previously a post office located in Cliola that was established on August 1, 1868.

References

Unincorporated communities in Adams County, Illinois
Unincorporated communities in Illinois